Herries is a surname. For the meaning and origins of this name please refer to Harris (surname).

Herries may refer to:

 Lord Herries of Terregles, a title in the Peerage of Scotland
 Herbert Herries, 1st Lord Herries of Terregles (c.1460–after 1503), Scottish landowner
 John Charles Herries (1778–1855), English politician and financier
 Sir Michael Herries (1923–1995), British businessman, chairman of Jardine Matheson and of the Royal Bank of Scotland
 Sir William Herries (1859–1923), English-born New Zealand politician
 Herries Chronicle, a series of historical romances by Hugh Walpole

See also
Herrys, surname
Harries
Harris
Harriss
Gordon Leslie Herries Davies (1932–2019), British geographer and historian of geography and geology

Surnames